Vitaliy Hrytsay (born 20 January 1991 in Horodysche, Cherkasy Oblast, Ukrainian SSR) is a professional Ukrainian footballer who plays for FC Lviv in the Ukrainian First League.

External links
Interview on Official Site 
Profile at Official FFU Site 

Ukrainian footballers
FC Lviv players
1991 births
Living people

Association football midfielders